Juticalpa Fútbol Club is a Honduran football club, based in Juticalpa, Honduras.

Nicknamed Los Canecheros, they currently play in the Honduran second division. Their home venue is the currently renovated and expanded Estadio Juan Ramón Brevé Vargas.

Achievements
Honduran Cup
Winners (1): 2015–16

Honduran Supercup
Runners-up (1): 2016

Liga de Ascenso
Winners (3): 2012–13 A, 2014–15 A, 2014–15 C
Runners-up (2): 2005–06 A, 2013–14 C

Current squad

League and cups performance

List of coaches
 Jairo Rios
 Roger Espinoza (2012 – Sept 15)
 Emilio Umanzor (Sept 2015 – Feb 2016)
 Wilmer Cruz (Feb 2016 – Nov 2016)
 Jorge Pineda (Nov 2016 – Mar 2017)
 Jose Maria Durón (Interim) (Mar 2017 – May 2017)
 Mauro Reyes (May 2017– Feb 2018)
 Ramon Maradiaga (Feb 2018 – May 2018 Suspended by FIFA)
 Hector Castellon (Jul 2018– Dec 2018)
 Robert Lima (Jan 2019– Feb 2019)
 Wilmer Cruz (Feb 2019–Jul 2019)
 Danilo Turcios (Jul 2019–Present)

References

Football clubs in Honduras